Gringo: The Dangerous Life of John McAfee is a 2016 American documentary film, about the portion of John McAfee's life spent in Belize. The film was directed by Nanette Burstein and produced by Ish Entertainment. The film had its world premiere at the Toronto International Film Festival on September 11, 2016, before airing on Showtime on September 24, 2016.

Synopsis
McAfee became a multi-millionaire after creating a prominent antivirus software, and later relocated to Belize. In April 2012, national police raided McAfee's estate based on suspicions of drug manufacture or trafficking. Later that year, McAfee's neighbor Greg Faull was murdered and McAfee went into hiding before crossing the border to Guatemala and being deported back to the United States. The documentary suggests that McAfee was involved in the murder due to a feud between him and Faull over McAfee's dogs. McAfee was never charged with any crime in Belize.

McAfee described the documentary as fiction.

Everyone interviewed retracted their statements after on camera and uploaded online due to feeling misled by the director's questioning and filed a cease and desist demand on grounds of untrue allegations.

Reception
John DeFore of The Hollywood Reporter praised the film, stating, "Though she says she began the documentary trying to understand how McAfee's likely guilt was so quickly forgotten by the media as they covered his latest political aspirations, Burstein seems to have wound up conducting an investigation more thorough, or at least more fruitful, than any local authority."
Jacob Brogan of Slate said of the film, "Even when Burstein's questions don't prompt easy answers, it's thrilling to consider the possibilities that arise in their wake", while Steve Greene of IndieWire said, "This film works best as an indictment of a sensationalist, tunnel-vision brand of media coverage that confuses eccentricity for legitimacy and eschews reporting in favor of the face-value testimony of a strong personality."

Criticism
Belize's leading newspaper published an article stating the producer paid money to purposely sensationalize the documentary, made interviewees sign papers that they did not or could not properly read and comprehend, or said it was only to be watched by John McAfee.

References

External links
 
 

2016 films
2016 documentary films
American documentary films
Documentary films about computer and internet entrepreneurs
Films directed by Nanette Burstein
Films set in Belize
Films shot in Belize
John McAfee
Showtime (TV network) documentary films
2010s English-language films
2010s American films